Eudontomyzon danfordi, the Carpathian brook lamprey or Danube lamprey, is a species of lamprey in the family Petromyzontidae. It is found in Austria, Bosnia and Herzegovina, Bulgaria, Croatia, Czech Republic, Hungary, Moldova, Romania, Serbia, Montenegro, Slovakia, and Ukraine. Unlike other brook lampreys, this fish is parasitic.

Description
It is a long eel-like fish and its girth is greatest in the middle. It is a uniform silvery-olive colour. It has no jaws and the mouth is surrounded by an oral plate with many small blunt teeth. There are cartilaginous plates inside the mouth and the central, lingual plate has nine to thirteen teeth, a fact that distinguishes it from other lamprey species. The single nostril is between the eyes and seven naked gill pores are behind them. The only fins are two dorsal fins that run most of the way along the spine, and a small diamond-shaped tail fin.

Distribution
The Carpathian brook lamprey is found in the Danube river basin, particularly in its tributaries the Tisza and the Timiș. It is a non-migratory, entirely freshwater species.

Biology
Reproduction usually takes place in the winter and march in small brooks and streams. The adults afterwards die. The larvae are called ammocoetes and at first develop among the sand and gravel on the bed of the stream. They feed on detritus, insect larvae and small crustaceans that they filter out of the sediment. They undergo metamorphosis when about four years old. As adults, they feed on living fish or dead sharks, gripping them with their small rasping teeth and swallowing smaller food items whole.

Status
The Carpathian brook lamprey is listed as being of "Endangered" in the IUCN Red List of Threatened Species. Although pollution is threatening their spawning sites and their numbers seem to be declining, this is not happening at a sufficiently rapid rate for them to be included in a higher risk category.

References

danfordi
Fish described in 1911
Freshwater fish of Europe
Fish of Europe
Taxonomy articles created by Polbot